SVGFF Premier Division, or NLA First Division Club Championship, is the top division of the Saint Vincent and the Grenadines Football Federation in Saint Vincent and the Grenadines. The Premier League began in 2009 under the name NLA SVGFF Club Championship.

Clubs
Current teams (2021)
Avenues United (Kingstown)
Awesome FC
Bluebirds FC
Hope International
Jebelle FC
Largo Height FC
North Leeward Predators
Pastures United
Sion Hill
System 3
The 2011 NLA Premier League season began in July and will last until December. Pastures United FC and K&R Strikers were promoted to the Premier League while United Force FC and Cane End United FC were relegated. Teams were:

Avenues United FC (Kingstown)
Camdonia Chelsea SC
Digicel Jebelle FC
JG & Sons Stingers FC
Hope International FC
K&R Strikers
Pastures United FC
Fitz Hughes Predators
Prospect United FC
System 3 FC
Toni Store Jugglers FC
Zodiac FC (Bequia)
Layou FC (Layou)

List of champions
Champions so far are: 
1998–99: Camdonia Chelsea (Lowmans)
1999–03: Not held
2003–04: Universal Mufflers Samba
2004–05: Universal Mufflers Samba
2005–06: Hope International
2006–07: Not held
2007–08: Apparently abandoned
2008–09: Not held
2009–10: Avenues United (Kingstown)
2010–11: Avenues United (Kingstown)
2012: Avenues United (Kingstown)
2013–14: BESCO Pastures
2014: Hope International
2015: Not held
2016: System 3
2017: Avenues United
2018-19: BESCO Pastures
2019-20: Hope International
2020-21: Abandoned
2021–22: Not held

References

External links
 St. Vincent and the Grenadines Football Federation

Football competitions in Saint Vincent and the Grenadines
Saint

2009 establishments in Saint Vincent and the Grenadines
Sports leagues established in 2009